40S ribosomal protein S13 is a protein that in humans is encoded by the RPS13 gene.

Function 

Ribosomes, the organelles that catalyze protein synthesis, consist of a small 40S subunit and a large 60S subunit. Together these subunits are composed of 4 RNA species and approximately 80 structurally distinct proteins. This gene encodes a ribosomal protein that is a component of the 40S subunit. The protein belongs to the S15P family of ribosomal proteins. It is located in the cytoplasm. The protein has been shown to bind to the 5.8S rRNA in rat. The gene product of the E. coli ortholog (ribosomal protein S15) functions at early steps in ribosome assembly. This gene is co-transcribed with two U14 small nucleolar RNA genes, which are located in its third and fifth introns. As is typical for genes encoding ribosomal proteins, there are multiple processed pseudogenes of this gene dispersed through the genome.

Interactions 

RPS13 has been shown to interact with PDCD4.

References

Further reading

External links 
 

Ribosomal proteins